Eduardo Reck Miranda (born 1963) is a Brazilian composer of chamber and electroacoustic pieces but is most notable in the United Kingdom for his scientific research into computer music, particularly in the field of human-machine interfaces where brain waves will replace keyboards and voice commands to permit the disabled to express themselves musically.

Biography

Early life
Miranda was born in Porto Alegre, Brazil. As one of the largest cities in Southern Brazil and a cultural, political and economical center, Porto Alegre had significant influence on Miranda's music.

Education
In the early 1990s, Miranda attended the University of Vale do Rio dos Sinos (UNISINOS) in Brazil where he received a degree in Data Processing Technology in 1985. Miranda then attended the Federal University of Rio Grande do Sul (UFRGS) where he studied music composition. Desiring to learn more about music technology and experience more of the world, Miranda made his way to the United Kingdom, where he started his post-graduate research studies at the University of York. At York, he developed an in-depth study into musical composition using cellular automata. In 1991, he received his MSc in Music Technology from York. After receiving his MSc, Miranda went briefly to Germany to study algorithmic composition at the Zentrum für Kunst und Medientechnologie in Karlsruhe.

In 1992, Miranda gained admittance to the Faculty of Music of the University of Edinburgh in Scotland where he obtained his PhD in the combined fields of music and artificial intelligence in 1995. For his doctoral thesis, he focused on musical knowledge representation, machine learning of music and software sound synthesis.

Experiences
After receiving his PhD, Miranda worked at the Edinburgh Parallel Computing Centre (EPCC). At EPCC, he developed Chaosynth, an innovative granular synthesis software that uses cellular automata to generate complex sound spectra.

In the mid-1990s, Miranda joined the Department of Music at the University of Glasgow, where he lectured music technology and electroacoustic music composition for a number of years. Then he moved to Paris, to take up a research position at Sony Computer Science Laboratory in the late 1990s.

At Sony, Miranda conducted research aimed at gaining a better understanding of the fundamental cognitive mechanisms employed in sound-based communication systems. This research led Miranda to focus on the evolution of the human ability to speak and the role of our musical capacity in the development of spoken languages. While at Sony, Miranda filed patents in the field of speech processing and made scientific contributions in the fields of speech synthesis, evolutionary music (computational) and cognitive neural modeling.

In the early 2000s he was appointed Visiting Professor of Interactive Media Arts at MECAD (School of Media Arts and Design) in Barcelona and Adjunct Associate Professor of Computer Science at the American University of Paris.

In 2003 Miranda moved to the University of Plymouth in the UK where he presently is a full Professor in Computer Music and Head of the  Interdisciplinary Centre for Computer Music Research (ICCMR). He is also an active associate member of the Computer Music Lab at the Federal University of Rio Grande do Sul (UFRGS), in his native town of Porto Alegre.

Musical compositions
Miranda's musical compositions have been broadcast and performed in a number of concerts and festivals worldwide, including the Festival Latino-Americano de Arte e Cultura (Brasília, 1987), the Encompor (Porto Alegre, 1988–89, 1995), the International Symposium for Electronic Arts (Minneapolis, 1993), the Festival Elektronischer Frühling (Vienna, 1993–94), and the Ciclo Acusmático (Bogotá, 1995). His music has won prizes and distinctions in Europe and South America, including awards at the Concours International de Musique Électroacoustique de Bourges (1994), the Concurso de Composição de Londrina (Brazil, 1995) and the Concorso Internazionale Luigi Russolo di Musica Elettroacustica (Italy, 1995, 1998). A review of his latest solo CD Mother Tongue, in The Wire magazine, reads, "These are immensely sophisticated pieces that constitute an electronic global music of convincingly organic simplicity."

Scientific research
Miranda is an active researcher in the field of Artificial Intelligence in Music. He is currently conducting research into neuroscience of music and into simulations of biological natural processes in music origins and evolution. Miranda has turned to artificial life models to coax computers into composing music.

Just as IBM's Deep Blue showed the world a computer can play chess as well as a human master, Miranda aims to demonstrate a computer program able to compose original music. So far, neural networks have succeeded in imitating distinct musical styles, but truly original compositions have remained elusive. Miranda is tackling this problem with an orchestra of virtual musician agents who interact to compose original music.

Published works

Print (language)

Published books
 Miranda, Eduardo Reck. (1998). Computer Sound Synthesis for the Electronic Musician. Focal Press, publisher. 
 Miranda, Eduardo Reck, editor. (1999).  Música y Nuevas Tecnologias: Perspectivas para le Siglo XXI. Publisher: L’Angelot. ISBN
 Miranda, Eduardo Reck, editor. (2000). Readings in Music and Artificial Intelligence. Publisher: Routledge. 
 Miranda, Eduardo. (2001). Composing Music with Computers. Publisher: Focal Press. 
 Miranda, Eduardo. (2002). Computer Sound Design: Synthesis Techniques and Programming. Publisher: Focal Press. Second edition. 
 Miranda, Eduardo Reck, and Wanderley, Marcelo. (2006).  New Digital Musical Instruments: Control And Interaction Beyond the Keyboard. Publisher: A-R Editions, Inc.

Published book chapters
(See  Computer Music Research publications)
 Miranda, E. R. (2005). "Musique de la Vie Artificiel", L. Poissant (Ed.), Art et Biotechnologies. Montreal, Canada: Presses de l'Universite du Quebec.
Todd, P. and Miranda, E. R. (2005). "Putting some (artificial) life into models of musical creativity", I. Deliege and G, Wiggins (Eds.), Musical creativity: Current research in theory and practice. London, UK: Psychology Press. (To appear)

Published research papers
Miranda's papers have been published by many international journals, including Evolutionary Computation, Brain and Language, Digital Creativity, Contemporary Music Review, Computer Music Journal, Journal of New Music Research, Journal of the Audio Engineering Society, Leonardo, Leonardo Music Journal, and Organized Sound.

Samples of published journal papers
 Miranda, E. R. (2006). "Artificial Phonology: On Synthesising Disembodied Humanoid Voice for Composing Music with Surreal Languages", Leonardo Music Journal, 15.
 Miranda, E. R. and Matthias, J. (2005). "Granular Sampling using a Pulse-Coupled Network of Spiking Neurons", In F. Rothlauf et al. (Eds.) EvoWorkshops 2005, Lecture Notes in Computer Science 3449, pp. 539–544. Berlin: Springer-Verlag.
 Miranda, E. R. and Brouse, A. (2005). "Interfacing the Brain Directly with Musical Systems: On developing systems for making music with brain signals ", Leonardo, 38(4):331–336.
 Valsamakis, N. and Miranda, E. R. (2005). "Iterative Sound Synthesis by means of Cross-Coupled Digital Oscillators", Digital Creativity. 16(2):79–92.
 Miranda, E. R., Roberts, S. and Stokes, M. (2004). "On Generating EEG for Controlling Musical Systems", Biomedizinische Technik, 49(1):75–76.
 Miranda, E. R. (2004). "At the Crossroads of Evolutionary Computation and Music: Self-Programming Synthesizers, Swarm Orchestras and the Origins of Melody", Evolutionary Computation, Vol. 12, No. 2. pp. 137–158.
 Miranda, E. R., Kirby, S. and Todd, P. (2003). "On Computational Models of the Evolution of Music: From the Origins of Musical Taste to the Emergence of Grammars", Contemporary Music Review, Vol. 22, No. 3, pp. 91–111.
 Miranda, E. R., Sharman, K., Kilborn, K., Duncan, A. (2003). "On Harnessing the Electroencephalogram for the Musical Braincap", Computer Music Journal, Vol. 27, No. 2, pp. 80–102.
 Miranda, E. R. (2003). "On the Music of Emergent Behaviour: What can Evolutionary Computation Bring to the Musician?", Leonardo, Vol. 36, No. 1, pp. 55–58.
 Miranda, E. R. (2003). "On the evolution of music in a society of self-taught digital creatures", Digital Creativity, Vol. 14, No. 1, pp. 29–42.
 Westerman, G. and Miranda, E. R. (2003). "Modelling the Development of Mirror Neurons for Auditory-Motor Integration", Journal of New Music Research, Vol. 31, No. 4, pp. 367–375.
 Westerman, G. and Miranda, E. R. (2003). "A New Model of Sensorimotor Coupling in the Development of Speech", Brain and Language, Vol.82, No.2, pp. 393–400.

Samples of published conference papers
Miranda, E. R. and Tikhanoff, V. (2005). "Musical Composition by an Autonomous Robot: An Approach to AIBO Interaction". Proceedings of TAROS 2005 – Towards Autonomous Robotic Systems, London (UK).
Miranda, E. R. and Brouse, A. (2005). "Toward Direct-Computer Musical Interfaces", Proceedings of the 5th International Conference on New Instruments for Musical Expression (NIME¹05), Vancouver, BC, Canada.
Miranda, E. R., Brouse, A., Boskamp, B. and Mullaney, H. (2005). "Plymouth Brain-Computer Music Interface Project: Intelligent Assistive Technology for Music-Making", Proceedings of the International Computer Music Conference 2005, Barcelona (Spain).
Miranda, E. R. and Maia Jr., A. (2005). "Granular Synthesis of Sounds Through Markov Chains with Fuzzy Control", Proceedings of the International Computer Music Conference 2005, Barcelona (Spain).
Miranda, E. R. and Zhang, Q. (2005). "Composition As Game Strategy: Making Music by Playing Board Games Against Evolved Artificial Neural Networks", Proceedings of the International Computer Music Conference 2005, Barcelona (Spain).
Miranda, E. R., Manzolli, J. and Maia Jr, A. (2005). "Granular Synthesis of Sounds through Fuzzyfied Markov Chains", Proceedings of IX National Convention of the Audio Engineering Society, São Paulo (Brazil).
Alvaro, J. Miranda, E. and Barros, B. (2005). "EV Ontology: Multilevel Knowledge Representation and Programming", Proceedings of the 10th Brazilian Symposium of Musical Computation (SBCM), Belo Horizonte (Brazil).
Coutinho, E., Miranda, E. R., and da Silva, P. (2005). "Evolving Emotional Behaviour for Expressive Performance of Music", Proceedings of Intelligent Virtual Agents 2005 (LNCS 3661–0497), Kos (Greece).
Coutinho, E., Gimenes, M., Martins, J. and Miranda, E. R. (2005). "Computational Musicology: An Artificial Life Approach", Proceedings of the 2nd Portuguese Workshop on Artificial Life and Evolutionary Algorithms Workshop, Covilhã (Portugal).
Coutinho, E. Miranda, E. R. and Cangelosi, A.(2005). "Towards a Model for Embodied Emotions", Proceedings of the Workshop on Affective Computing: Towards Affective Intelligent Systems (AC 2005), Covilhã (Portugal).
Gimenes, M., Miranda, E. R. and Johnson, C. (2005). "A Memetic Approach to the Evolution of Rhythms in a Society of Software Agents", Proceedings of the 10th Brazilian Symposium of Musical Computation (SBCM), Belo Horizonte (Brazil)
Gimenes, M., Miranda, E. R. and Johnson, C. (2005). "Towards an intelligent rhythmic generator based on given examples: a memetic approach", Proceedings of the Digital Music Research Network Summer Conference. University of Glasgow, Glasgow, (UK).
Livingstone, D. and Miranda, E. (2005). "Orb3 Adaptive Interface Design for Real time Sound Synthesis & Diffusion within Socially Mediated Spaces", Proceedings of the 5th International Conference on New Instruments for Musical Expression (NIME'05), Vancouver, BC, Canada.
Livingstone, D. and Miranda, E. (2005). "ORB3 – Musical Robots within an Adaptive Social Composition System" Proceedings of the International Computer Music Conference 2005, Barcelona (Spain).
Miranda, E. R. (2004). "Artificial Life and the Evolution of Music", Proceedings of International Symposium on Music & Science, Coimbra, Portugal.
Burraston, D., Edmonds, E., Livingstone, D. and Miranda, E. R. (2004). "Cellular Automata in MIDI based Computer Music". Proceedings of the International Computer Music Conference, Miami (USA).
Livingstone, D. and Miranda, E. R. (2004). "Composition for Ubiquitous Responsive Environments", Proceedings of the International Computer Music Conference, Miami (USA).
Martins, J. P. M., Pereira, F., Miranda, E. R. and Cardoso, A. (2004). "Enhancing Sound Design with Conceptual Blending of Sound Descriptors", Proceedings of the Workshop on Computational Creativity (CC'04) – European Conference on Case-Based Reasoning (ECCBR), Technical Report 142–04, pp. 243–255, Universidad Complutense de Madrid (Spain).
Miranda, E. R. (2003). "Musical Applications of Evolutionary Computing: From Sound Design to Evolutionary Musicology", Proceedings of Colloquium Past, Present and Future of Technology in Music, IPEM – Dept. of Musicology, Ghent University, Ghent, Belgium, pp. 40–53.

Musical compositions

Orchestral music
 Miranda, Eduardo Reck. (1987). Atmos, string orchestra
 Miranda, Eduardo Reck. (1993). Entre o Absurdo e o Mistério, small orchestra

Chamber music
 Miranda, Eduardo Reck. (1986). Parábula, piano, xylophone.
 Miranda, Eduardo Reck. (1987). Anátema, flute, oboe, clarinet.
 Miranda, Eduardo Reck. (1989). Zenrinbau, berimbau ensemble.
 Miranda, Eduardo Reck. (1989). Mônadas, percussion ensemble.
 Miranda, Eduardo Reck. (1996). Wee Batucada Scotica, string quartet.
 Miranda, Eduardo Reck. (1996). Suíte para Vibrafone, vibraphone.

Electroacoustic music 
 Miranda, Eduardo Reck. (1988). Efervescência em 2 Movimentos, tape.
 Miranda, Eduardo Reck. (1989). Azteka, tape.
 Miranda, Eduardo Reck. (1991). Noises, tape.
 Miranda, Eduardo Reck. (1992). The Turning of the Tide, prepared violin, tape.
 Miranda, Eduardo Reck. (1993). Gestures, tape.
 Miranda, Eduardo Reck. (1993). Deep Resonance, tape.
 Miranda, Eduardo Reck. (1993). Ítalo Calvino takes Jorge Borges on a taxi journey in Berlin, tape.
 Miranda, Eduardo Reck. (1994). Olivine Trees, tape.
 Miranda, Eduardo Reck. (1991–1995). Electroacoustic Sambas I-X, tape.
 Miranda, Eduardo Reck. (1995). Goma Arábica, tape.
 Miranda, Eduardo Reck. (1997). Requiem per una veu perduda, mezzo-soprano, tape, live electronics.
 Miranda, Eduardo Reck. (1999). Grain-Streams, piano, tape, live electronics.
 Miranda, Eduardo Reck. (2001). Le Jardin de Jérôme, tape.

Discography
 Miranda, Eduardo Reck. (1995). Olivine Trees. (Simpósio Brasileiro de Computação e Música: NUCOM01).
 Miranda, Eduardo Reck. (1996). Goma Arábica. (Sociedade Brasileira de Música Eletroacústica: SBME01).
 Miranda, Eduardo Reck. (1998). Electroacoustic Samba X. (OOdiscs: 45).
 Miranda, Eduardo Reck. (1998). Requiem per una veu perduda. (Organised Sound: 3/3).
 Miranda, Eduardo Reck. (1999). Electroacoustic Sambas II-III. (IMEB/UNESCO/CIME: LDC 278068/69).
 Miranda, Eduardo Reck. (2000). Electroacoustic Samba I. (Leonardo Music Journal: 10).
 Miranda, Eduardo Reck (composer). (2004). Mother Tongue. Audio CD. Label: Sargasso Records. ASIN: B00029LO8G

See also

AIBO 
Algorithmic composition
Artificial intelligence
Artificial life
Brain-computer interface
Canadian Electroacoustic Community
Cellular automata
Chamber music
Computer music
Contemporary music
EEG
Electroacoustic music
Electroencephalophone
Electronic music
Evolutionary computing
Evolutionary music
Granular synthesis
Human-computer interaction
Cognitive neuroscience of music
Neural engineering
Neuroprosthetics
neuroscience of music
Origins of music
Parallel computing
Robotics
Sound synthesis
Speech synthesis

Footnotes and references

External links

 Faculty homepage

1963 births
Living people
People from Rio Grande do Sul
Brain–computer interfacing
Brazilian composers
Human–computer interaction
Neural engineering
Neuroprosthetics
Academics of the University of Plymouth
Cellular automatists
British people of Brazilian descent
Brazilian expatriates in the United Kingdom
Brazilian people of German descent
Alumni of the University of Edinburgh
Alumni of the University of York